De Blob (stylized as de BLOB) is a puzzle-platform game. Players explore and liberate an alien city from the evil, monochromatic INKT Corporation that has taken over the city and outlawed all color and fun from daily life. Playing as Blob, players embark on a quest to re-animate the fictional Chroma City and free it from the INKT Corporation by splattering buildings, landmarks, and citizens with color.

De Blob was developed by Blue Tongue Entertainment for the Wii, while a cancelled version for the Nintendo DS was being developed by Helixe, with both versions being published by THQ. The game was originally scheduled for a February 2008 release, but was delayed and then released on 22 September for the Wii. An iOS adaption of the game was released earlier on 8 July the same year.

De Blob was released for Microsoft Windows on 27 April 2017, ported by BlitWorks. Ports of the game for PlayStation 4 and Xbox One came later on November 14 of the same year. A Nintendo Switch port was released on June 26, 2018.

Gameplay
The player character — de Blob — starts out as a ball of clear "water". de Blob is free to roll around and collect paint from Paintbots in the three colors of red, yellow and blue, which can be combined into green, orange, purple and brown. de Blob then merely has to touch a building, lamppost, billboard, or other object for the entire surface of said object to be smeared in his current color. As he colors the city, the game's soundtrack, featuring live bands which recorded slow and fast versions of each "lick" (each hit), gradually adds more instrumentation as well as an additional "layer" of sound corresponding to de Blob's current color—being red usually adds a saxophone solo to the music, for example. As de Blob collects paint, his size increases to a maximum of 100; each object he paints costs a paint point, as does attacking enemies, while touching water makes de Blob remove his color.

While de Blob is free to paint, there are various missions which can or must be completed. These missions are given by various members of the Color Underground and include painting certain buildings certain colours and transforming a landmark with enough of a certain color of paint (for example, 30 yellow paint points). Each of the 10 levels have a main landmark to paint, which may require more than one color and more paint points than usual.

There are various hazards to avoid, however. Pools of ink turn de Blob black and cause him to lose paint points constantly; when he loses all of his paint points, he loses a life. Ink must be washed out with water. The INKT forces, Inkies, will send out foot soldiers to stop de Blob, as well as other forces—handheld ink guns, turrets, tanks, jetbikes and even Inkies that are immune to all but a specific color. There are also other hazards, such as hotplates, electric plates and spikes.

As de Blob paints Chroma City and completes missions, points are accumulated. Each gate separating the player from the next part of a stage can be opened by reaching a certain number of points. Once the final gate is open, the stage can be completed.

Plot
Told through a combination of pre-rendered cinematic sequences and in-game dialog, de Blob tells the story of Chroma City, its invasion by the INKT Corporation and its subsequent liberation by the titular Blob and the Color Underground.

Initially a lively and colorful city populated by its equally colorful and diverse citizens, the Raydians, Chroma City is suddenly invaded by the INKT Corporation. An Alien corporate military dictatorship, INKT is led by the villainous Comrade Black and dedicated to the eradication of color through its "War on Color". Chroma City quickly falls to the invading army of Inkies and color-draining Leechbots, leaving its landscape barren, its flora withered and its fauna in hiding. The citizens are rounded up and turned into "Graydians", encased in homogeneous gray prison suits distinguished only by a bar code on the back of each shell. The Graydians are forced to serve as both menial labor and as a living resource of ink, the latter of which is mined literally from their sadness.

Blob witnesses the takeover of Chroma City from his jungle retreat and goes into action, first rescuing the only remaining pocket of resistance, the Color Underground. Blob joins the group, and under their orders, begins to win back sections of the city and arouse the vicious ire of Comrade Black. In response, Black orders everything from propaganda campaigns to the creation of super soldiers in an attempt to stop Blob, though to no avail.

With nearly all of Chroma City in control of the Color Underground, Comrade Black desperately orders all his troops to retreat to his spaceship in Lake Raydia, and attempts to launch all the stolen color into a black hole where it will be lost forever. However, Blob manages to stowaway onto the spaceship and defeat Black, then detonates a device that devours the spacecraft in a burst of color and whimsy while escaping on a Hoverboard. With the Raydians finally safe, Blob returns to his jungle retreat, napping on a tree as he was at the story's beginning.  A post-credit scene reveals that Comrade Black survived the destruction of his spaceship, and is now trapped on a tiny island populated by cute, colourful creatures, much to his hatred.

Development

de Blob was originally developed as a downloadable game for Microsoft Windows by eight students of Game Design & Development at the Utrecht School of the Arts and one student studying Game and Media Technology at Utrecht University, in the Netherlands. At the time of conception, sections of Utrecht were being rebuilt and the principal task in creating the game was to convey how the railroad station area of Utrecht would look in 10 years. It was primarily intended for short-duration play, keeping people entertained for at least a few minutes at a booth while learning about the city's plans for the station. The city of Utrecht adopted Blob, de Blobs protagonist, as its mascot.

Two versions of the game were released as freeware in late June 2006 through the Utrecht School of the Arts website. There was a Dutch version, called "De Blob", and an English version, called "The Blob" ("de" is the Dutch cognate of "the"). It was created using the OGRE graphics engine, the FMOD audio engine, and the Open Dynamics Engine for physics and collision detection. The developers also stated that they had used 3D Studio MAX for modeling-level designs, Adobe Photoshop for textures, and Reason and Sound Forge for audio.
While the freeware version was referred to by its English name internationally, the Dutch name was adopted by THQ as its official title. It was further stylized without a capital letter to become "de Blob".

THQ noticed the game, was very impressed with the team's work and acquired the rights to the game. THQ handed over the game to Blue Tongue Entertainment and Helixe, with both companies developing their versions for different consoles.

Five members of the original team later formed Ronimo Games.

Reception

de Blob received positive reviews overall. IGN called it "one of the best third-party efforts to come over to Wii in a long time". Nintendo Power said: "Admittedly, there's not a ton of variety...but it remains fun throughout". Nintendo World Report claimed "de Blob is defined by its pure unadulterated fun", rating it a 9/10. Game Informer, rating de Blob a 7.75/10, said "the game is missing the most important element to a game: the gameplay". Eurogamer described de Blob as "excellent and thoroughly original", while noting that "the best and worst thing about de Blob is that it's got 'Destined For Cult Status' written all over it". Edge rated de Blob an 8/10, calling it "a game for meandering in, for absorbing and messing around with". GameSpot rated the Wii version an 8/10. Official Nintendo Magazine awarded the game both a rating of 92% and its Gold Award, stating that "de Blob is an absolutely flippin' awesome videogame". N-Europe said that De Blob was "the most colourful and ambitiously fresh" title on the Wii. It won or was nominated for several Wii-specific awards from IGN in its 2008 video game awards, including Best Platform Game, Best Graphics Technology, and Best Use of Sound. It was nominated for several other Wii-specific awards by IGN, including Best New IP, Best Original Score, Most Innovative Design, and Game of the Year.

de Blob sold more than 230,000 copies by December 2008 in the United States. THQ stated they have shipped more than 700,000 copies of the game, and have sold more than 700,000 copies worldwide. THQ CEO Brian Farrell believed the success of the game was related to its "Nintendo-esque" style. THQ responded to these sales by telling IGN to tell their readers to expect more de Blob in the future.

The Nintendo Switch version was nominated for "Game, Classic Revival" at the 2019 National Academy of Video Game Trade Reviewers Awards.

Sequel

During THQ's fiscal third quarter conference call, president and CEO Brian Farrell announced both de Blob and Saints Row would see new titles in the coming years. Farrell said that "our de Blob franchise will be back again in fiscal 2011. We successfully launched this highly-rated franchise in fiscal 2009 to broad, critical acclaim".

References

External links
 
 Interview with Nick Hagger creative director

 
2008 video games
IOS games
Cancelled Nintendo DS games
Embracer Group franchises
Multiplayer and single-player video games
Puzzle-platform games
THQ games
THQ Nordic games
Video games developed in Australia
Video games developed in Finland
Video games developed in Spain
Video games scored by John Guscott
Wii games
Windows games
Video games using Havok
PlayStation 4 games
Xbox One games
Nintendo Switch games
3D platform games
Blue Tongue Entertainment games
Universomo games
BlitWorks games